Ian Henrik Lundin (born 1960) is a Swedish-Canadian billionaire businessman, the chairman of Lundin Petroleum.

Personal life
Ian Lundin was born in 1960, the son of Adolf H. Lundin, the founder of Lundin Mining and Lundin Petroleum.

Career
Lundin is chairman of Lundin Petroleum.

Together with his older brother Lukas Lundin, he has a net worth of at least US$2.5 billion.

On 11 November 2021, Lundin was indicted in Stockholm District Court for abetting grave war crimes in Sudan. He risks a life sentence if convicted.

Personal life
Lundin and wife Virginia live in Geneva, Switzerland, and have a son and a daughter together.

References

1960 births
Canadian billionaires
Living people
Ian
Businesspeople from Geneva
Swedish billionaires